Christopher R. Windom (born December 24, 1990) is an American professional racing driver. Windom was the seventh driver to complete a United States Auto Club (USAC) Triple Crown by winning titles in sprint cars, midget cars, and Silver Crown.

USAC
Windom won the 2017 USAC National Sprint Car Championship, the 2016 USAC Silver Crown Championship, and the 2020 National Midget Car championship. He is also a two-time Indiana Sprint Week (2011, 2018) and Eastern Storm (2017, 2018) champion, and a two-time winner of the Little 500 (2011, 2015).

Stock car racing
Windom also participates in stock car racing, making seven starts from 2011 to 2015 in the ARCA Racing Series and three starts in the NASCAR Camping World Truck Series in 2017 for MB Motorsports and one in 2018 for DGR-Crosley with a best finish of 14th at Eldora Speedway. In 2021, he joined Rick Ware Racing for his NASCAR Cup Series debut at Bristol Motor Speedway's dirt event, where he finished 33rd after suffering an engine failure. He also ran the Corn Belt 150 at Knoxville in place of Michael Annett in the No. 02 for Young's Motorsports.

Indy Lights
On March 27, 2018, it was announced that Windom would make his Indy Lights debut driving for Belardi Auto Racing in the Freedom 100 at the Indianapolis Motor Speedway with support from Jonathan Byrd's Racing, the same group that supported fellow sprint car driver Bryan Clauson venture into Indy Lights and the IndyCar Series. Windom, however, crashed during the first morning testing session on May 21 and the damage to the car forced Windom to withdraw from the Freedom 100.

Motorsports career results

NASCAR
(key) (Bold – Pole position awarded by qualifying time. Italics – Pole position earned by points standings or practice time. * – Most laps led.)

Cup Series

Camping World Truck Series

 Season still in progress
 Ineligible for series points

ARCA Racing Series
(key) (Bold – Pole position awarded by qualifying time. Italics – Pole position earned by points standings or practice time. * – Most laps led.)

American open-wheel racing results
(key)

Indy Lights

References

External links

 

1990 births
Living people
Racing drivers from Illinois
ARCA Menards Series drivers
NASCAR drivers
Indy Lights drivers
People from Canton, Illinois
USAC Silver Crown Series drivers